Liptovská Štiavnica is a village and municipality in Ružomberok District in the Žilina Region of northern Slovakia.

History
In historical records the village was first mentioned in 1300.

Geography
The municipality lies at an altitude of 560 metres and covers an area of 32.372 km². It has a population of about 905 people.

External links
https://web.archive.org/web/20080111223415/http://www.statistics.sk/mosmis/eng/run.html

Villages and municipalities in Ružomberok District